The 2008 Fresno State Bulldogs baseball team represented California State University, Fresno in the NCAA Division I baseball season of 2008.  They played their home games at Beiden Field in Fresno, California.  The team was coached by Mike Batesole who was in his fifth season at Fresno State.  Under Batesole, Fresno State has won three Western Athletic Conference Championships in a row, and he has a 172-134 record with the Bulldogs.

In a Cinderella run through the postseason, the Fresno State Bulldogs defeated the Georgia Bulldogs in the 2008 College World Series finals to win its first NCAA Division I Championship in baseball. This led to their 3rd national championship in the NCAA organization, adding to their championships in Softball (1998) and Men's Track & Field (1964-Division II).

Schedule and results
Before the season occurred, Fresno State entered the season ranked in the Collegiate Baseball newspaper's Fabulous 40 for the third consecutive season, at #21. Fresno State was also ranked #21 by the preseason magazine Baseball America. Fresno State also was preseason pick of the WAC coaches as the favorite to win the 2008 season; additionally, seven players were selected to the Preseason All-WAC Team, including the preseason Player of the Year Steve Susdorf and Pitcher of the Year Clayton Allison

Roster

Coaches

Players

Rankings

Awards and honors

2008 Major League Baseball Draft
The following members of the 2008 Fresno State baseball team were drafted in the 2008 MLB Draft.

References

Fresno State Bulldogs baseball seasons
Fresno State Bulldogs Baseball Team, 2008
NCAA Division I Baseball Championship seasons
College World Series seasons
Western Athletic Conference baseball champion seasons
Fresno State